Jonas Ennery (Jan. 2, 1801, Nancy - May 19, 1863, Brussels) was a French deputy. He was for twenty-six years attached to the Jewish school of Strasbourg, of which he became the head. In collaboration with Hirth, he compiled a Dictionnaire Général de Géographie Universelle (4 vols., Strasburg, 1839–41), for which Cuvier wrote a preface. Soon afterward he published Le Sentier d'Israël, ou Bible des Jeunes Israélites (Paris, Metz, and Strasburg, 1843). At the request of the Société des Bons Livres he took part in the editorship of Prières d'un Cœur Israélite, which appeared in 1848.

In 1849, despite anti-Jewish rioting in Alsace, Ennery was elected representative for the department of the Lower Rhine, and sat among the members of the "Mountain." He devoted his attention principally to scholastic questions. After the coup d'état he resisted the new order of things, and was exiled for life in 1852. He retired to Brussels, where he lived as a teacher until his death.

Ennery's brother, Marchand Ennery, was the chief rabbi of Paris.

References

1801 births
1863 deaths
Writers from Nancy, France
Politicians from Nancy, France
Jewish French politicians
The Mountain (1849) politicians
Members of the National Legislative Assembly of the French Second Republic
French lexicographers
French geographers
French educators
19th-century lexicographers